Empis verralli  is a species of fly in the family Empididae. It is included in the subgenus Anacrostichus. It is found in the Palearctic.

References

External links
 Images representing Empis at BOLD

Empis
Insects described in 1927
Asilomorph flies of Europe